Cobun Creek is a stream in the U.S. state of West Virginia.

Cobun Creek derives its name from Jonathan Coburn, an 18th-century pioneer.

References

Rivers of Monongalia County, West Virginia
Rivers of West Virginia